The Madras Institute of Orthopaedics and Traumatology, known in short as the MIOT International Hospital, is a multi-specialty hospital in Manapakkam, Chennai, India. It is a specialty hospital in the field of joint replacement surgeries, Interventional Cardiology, orthopaedics and trauma. Founded by P. V. A. Mohandas, the hospital was established in February 1999 on a  land with German collaboration, with an initial investment of 500,000. The hospital has 1000 beds and employs 170 physicians. It receives nearly 3,500 foreign patients every year, contributing 25 percent of the hospital's patients. North and East Africa account for many of these foreign patients.

History
MIOT Hospital began as an independent entity, specialising in orthopaedics, at Chennai-based Vijaya Hospital in 1987. It moved to Manapakkam, a suburb of Chennai, in 1999. Its founder and managing director, P. V. A. Mohandas, is also chief surgeon in the Department of Orthopaedic Surgery. Started as a centre for orthopaedics, the hospital has become a multi-speciality one dealing with thoracic and cardiovascular care, cardiology, nephrology, neurosurgery, oncology and radiation oncology, hip-replacement surgery, knee replacement, accident surgery, plastic surgery, craniofacial and cosmetic surgery, paediatrics, and obstetrics.

On 18 May 2012, a heart revive centre was inaugurated at a cost of 300 million, with a full-fledged cathlab and an electro-physiology laboratory for the treatment of arrhythmia, or irregular heartbeat. In the same year, the hospital started the MIOT International Centre housing the departments of oncology, radiation oncology, medical oncology, surgical oncology, liver transplant centre and bone marrow transplant centre. There are also plans to open a heart transplant centre.

Achievements

Bone marrow transplant 
The MIOT Institute of Haematology, Haemato-Oncology & BMT performed the first T-replete haplo identical bone marrow transplant in India in 2013.

Liver transplant 
An emergency liver transplant saved a rapidly deteriorating 26-year-old mother with jaundice and a severely damaged liver.

Biplane CathLab 
For the first time in India, MIOT Hospitals brings a Biplane CathLab with Cone Beam CT, 3D Echo and software intelligence – all on a single platform.

The future
The hospital group is investing 2,800 million on a 600-bed 6-star facility for cancer treatment named 'MIOT International' under construction near the existing facility. The 13-floor building will house 14 operation theatres, a bunker, a sterilisation unit, 500 premium rooms and 100 beds for critical care. It is being constructed by L&T. It will employ about 100 physicians.

Awards and recognition
 Niryat Shree Gold Award 2002 – 2003
 Niryat Shree Gold Award 2009 – 2010
FIEO Niryat Shree Bronze Trophy 2008 – 2009
FIEO Southern Region Export Excellence Award 2012 – 2013
 FIEO Southern Region Export Excellence Award 2013 – 2014
 FIEO Southern Region Export Excellence Award 2015 – 2016

Accreditations 

 National Accreditation Board for Hospitals & Healthcare Providers
 National Accreditation Board for Hospitals & Healthcare Providers - Medical Imaging services

MoU 
MIOT Hospitals signs MoU With Leading Transplant Centre "The Alfred Hospital", Australia.

MIOT signs MoU with The Christie Foundation for cancer treatment

See also

Healthcare in Chennai

References

External links
Official website

Hospital buildings completed in 1999
Hospitals in Chennai
Companies based in Chennai
1999 establishments in Tamil Nadu
20th-century architecture in India